Vicente Catalan was a Cuban-Filipino of Criollo descent known for his mutiny against his Spanish naval officers in the 800-ton steamer of the Compania Tobacco De Filipinas seized by its Filipino Crew who killed the Spanish Officers. The Filipino mutineers were led by the Ship's Second Officer, the Cuban Vicente Catalan who took over as the Ship's Captain and proclaimed himself Admiral of the Filipino Navy.

Making themselves under the Command of General Emilio Aguinaldo, Vicente Catalan was commissioned as a Navy Captain
in the Philippine Revolutionary Navy. The steamer now rechristened as FILIPINAS was then armed with Cannons captured in Cavite and provided Naval Gunfire Support to the Revolutionaries as well as a Transport.

The flagship was reinforced by merchant ships such as the Taaleño, Balayan and Purisima Conception that had been donated to the insurgent forces. Admiral Catalan with his Filipino sailors helped seize Subic Bay. The mutiny and seizure of the ship FILIPINAS became an international cause when the Germans objected to the Filipino flag and the French demanded the ship's return to them, claiming they actually owned it.

Despite the diplomatic backlash from foreign powers, the international incident drew attention to the increasingly aggressive campaign of the Filipinos to oust the Spaniards and establish an independent republic.

References

Cuban soldiers
Philippine Army
Philippine Navy
Latin America